The molecular formula C21H36O5 (molar mass: 368.51 g/mol, exact mass: 368.2563 u) may refer to:

 Betaenone B
 Carboprost

Molecular formulas